Dukinfield is a town in Tameside, Greater Manchester, England, on the south bank of the River Tame opposite Ashton-under-Lyne,  east of Manchester. At the 2011 Census, it had a population of 19,306.

Within the boundaries of the historic county of Cheshire, the town developed as a result of the Industrial Revolution when it became the site of coal mining and cotton manufacturing.

History

Early history
The earliest evidence of human activity around Dukinfield comes from a collection of four flints from the late Neolithic/early Bronze Age. The artifacts were discovered on the site of Dukinfield Hall and have been taken as evidence of a prehistoric settlement on the site. There is no further evidence of activity in the area until the Roman period. A 3rd century bronze Roman coin, from the reign of Emperor Tetricus I was discovered in the town.

Dukinfield means "Raven of the Field" and derives from the Old English duce and feld.

Early records show the township was included in the fee of Dunham Massey. It was held by Matthew de Bramhall in about 1190
and after that by a family who took the name "De Dokenfeld". The family lived at the moated Dukinfield Old Hall, which originated from after the Norman conquest and was rebuilt in Tudor times, remaining the home of the Dukinfields till the 18th century, after which it became derelict. During the English Civil War, Colonel Robert Duckenfield of Dukinfield Hall was a noted commander in the New Model Army. The baronetcy, Dukinfield of Dukinfield, Cheshire was created in 1665 for Robert Dukinfield, son of Colonel Robert Dukinfield. The Dukinfields held the manor for five centuries until the widow of Sir William Dukinfield Daniel married the artist, John Astley, in 1767. In 1848 his descendant, colliery owner Francis Dukinfield Palmer Astley, was the lord of the manor. Dukinfield Lodge was built by the Astleys on a hill overlooking the River Tame.

Industrial Revolution
Industrialisation – particularly the cotton trade – helped shape the town, but its rapid development destroyed its former pasture and meadow land. Two cotton mills were built before 1794 and by 1825 there were seven. The industry continued to expand and by the end of the 19th century 14 spinning mills of varying sizes were in operation. The largest mills were built in brick during the 1890s with four or five storeys, large windows, ornamental towers, engine houses and tall brick built chimneys. They included Tower, Tame Valley, River, Park Road and Queen Mills. Most of the cotton mills have now been demolished, but some have been preserved and converted into flats.

Coal pits exploiting the underlying coal measures to the south of the Lancashire Coalfield were a major part of Dukinfield's industrial history, one pithead was located on Birch Lane, now the site of All Saints' Catholic College, with another near the northern border with Ashton-under-Lyne. Francis Dukinfield Astley developed two collieries in the town, Dukinfield and Astley Deep Pit, and both had explosions killing many workers. Dukinfield Colliery (also known as Lakes Pit or Victoria Colliery)
was owned by Astley's Dukinfield Colliery Company. The colliery had two shafts, the downcast was 1,020 feet deep to the
Black mine (coal seam) and was connected to the upcast ventilation shaft. On 4 June 1867, 38 men and boys died of suffocation following an explosion caused by a faulty safety lamp and poor management.

Astley Deep Pit, was off King's Street opposite Brownlea Avenue was developed by Astley but by 1874 was owned by Benjamin Ashton. The colliery's downcast shaft was 2,058 feet deep and its workings extended over a mile to the
south and about 1,300 yards to the north of the shaft. This colliery was reported to be at one time, the deepest coal mine in the world, at 2,100 feet (640 metres) and had three shafts. On 14 April 1874 an underground gas explosion killed 54 men. After the pit closed in 1901 the shafts were filled in and left to stand for many years before being built on. It is now the site of a development of houses comprising Angel Close, Oval Drive and Silver Close.

Samuel Robinson a Unitarian, industrialist and scholar founded the village library in 1833 and was dubbed the "foremost promoter of education in the district" before his death in 1884. Daniel Adamson a mechanical engineer became the first chairman of the Manchester Ship Canal Company. He owned an engineering works producing Lancashire boilers at Newton Wood beside the Manchester, Sheffield and Lincolnshire Railway. He died on 13 January 1890. The Adamson Military Band, named after Adamson is based in Dukinfield. The MS&LR's successor, the Great Central Railway, moved its carriage and wagon works to Dukinfield in 1910.

Dukinfield and its surrounding towns were major centres of civil revolt during the 19th century and briefly the area was a hotbed of Chartism, the popular movement calling for universal suffrage via a "People's Charter". Chartist leader, Reverend Joseph Rayner Stephens is buried in St John's Churchyard.

Governance

In the Middle Ages, Dukinfield was part of the parish of Stockport in the Macclesfield Hundred. It became a civil parish in 1866 and in 1894 those parts not already included in the Municipal Borough of Stalybridge became an urban district in the administrative county of Cheshire. The town was granted municipal borough status in 1899 under the provisions of the Municipal Corporations Act 1882, and was expanded in 1936, gaining part of the civil parish of Matley, which had been abolished.

In 1974, the Municipal Borough of Dukinfield was abolished, and its territory amalgamated into the newly created Metropolitan Borough of Tameside, in the metropolitan county of Greater Manchester.

Dukinfield is currently represented by the occupants of 6 of the 57 seats on Tameside Metropolitan Borough Council. These seats are spread over two wards: Dukinfield and Dukinfield Stalybridge. Dukinfield currently has five Labour councillors and one Conservative councillor.

Andrew Gwynne is Dukinfield's Member of Parliament. He was elected in 2005 to represent the Denton and Reddish constituency, of which the town of Dukinfield is a part. Between 1918 and 1997 Dukinfield was part of the Stalybridge and Hyde constituency.

Geography and geology

The town is situated at the edge of the Cheshire Plain where it meets the Pennines, and Dukinfield is the first town on the hill. The park is situated approximately a quarter of a mile from the town hall along King Street towards Hyde in the south. Because of the quite steep rise out of the plain, the park is terraced and is over 90 feet higher at the top. The hill flattens out slightly before rising steeply again towards the east, where the library is situated.
The town hall is also at the base of the same hill with Astley Street rising steeply along its shorter southern side before climbing some 120 feet to the crest of the ridge. The local soil is mainly clayey with some alluvial deposits.

The underlying geology is the middle coal measures, which run north–south under Tameside. Dukinfield is situated on the site of a vast ancient lake or swamp that covered the area. This ancient lake is the reason coal is found in the area. The layers of shale and coal are laid on top of each other in bands, only 20 or 30 feet thick. The coal deposits fall away at a 20-degree or so angle, and runs eight or nine miles from the base of the hill out under the plain. The coal deposits are known as the Dukinfield Marine Band and form a V shape running out from here towards Stockport in the south and Ashton Moss in the north-east. Dukinfield had several mines of which Astley Deep Pit had the best coal. There are many seams or mines of coal found here. Dukinfield coal was known to be the best for heating and steam generation. Only a mile to the south along Hyde Road is another large mine, the Dewsnap Colliery, which was of a lower quality and so was not in as much demand.
The Dukinfield Marine Band outcrops at Dukinfield, and continues up the hill towards the top of the ridge, some 140 feet above the level of the plain where it flattens out and a third mine was situated.

Demography

According to the Office for National Statistics, at the time of the United Kingdom Census 2001, Dukinfield had a population of 18,885. Of those over 16 years old, 29.1% were single (never married), 42.1% married, and 9.4% divorced. Dukinfield's 8,072 households included 31.2% one-person, 36.8% married couples living together, 9.9% were co-habiting couples, and 10.5% single parents with their children. Of those aged 16–74, 35.1% had no academic qualifications.

At the 2001 UK census, 79.0% of Dukinfield's residents reported themselves as Christian, 0.9% Hindu, 0.8% Muslim, and 0.1% Buddhist. The census recorded 12.2% as having no religion, 0.1% had an alternative religion and 6.8% did not state their religion.

Population change

Dukinfield grew from a small village just south of Ashton-under-Lyne with open land to the south and east, the gap between it and the surrounding towns of Hyde and Matley being a semicircle around 1.5 miles wide, to fill the gap entirely by the late 1940s. In its early days from 1801, and previously, the population was small but boomed during the days of the cotton industry and later the coal industry with its major rail junction adding to its prosperity and growth.

The industries which sustained it died out by the turn of the 1900s, leaving only the Daniel Adamson Ltd works but it managed to maintain its population and has only declined by 2000 since 1921. One reason is that it has a central location on the main road from Stockport to Ashton-under-Lyne and is within easy commuting distance of Manchester.

Economy

According to the 2001 UK census, the industry of employment of residents of Dukinfield aged 16–74 was 24.4% manufacturing, 19.3% retail and wholesale, 10.0% health and social work, 9.5% property and business services, 7.2% construction, 6.5% transport and communications, 5.7% education, 4.7% public administration, 4.4% finance, 3.4% hotels and restaurants, 1.0% energy and water supply, 0.3% agriculture, 0.1% mining, and 3.6% other. Compared with national figures, the town had a relatively high proportion of people working in manufacturing, and low levels of people working in agriculture, public administration, and education. The census recorded the economic activity of residents aged 16–74, 2.1% students were with jobs, 2.8% students without jobs, 4.9% looking after home or family, 7.9% permanently sick or disabled, and 2.7% economically inactive for other reasons.

Landmarks

Dukinfield Town Hall was built in the late 1890s and opened in 1901. It was built by raising funds from the inception of the Borough of Dukinfield. The park was also made and cost the same amount of money as the town hall. There is an 80 ft difference between the King Street lower side and the rear of the park, being the first hill off the Cheshire Plain, and on a clear day it is possible to stand at the top of the steps and see Manchester city centre.

Old Hall Chapel is an old historic church, claiming to be the first independent church in the 17th century. It was built during the late 15th century but is unfortunately partially derelict due to fire in the 1970s which destroyed much of the superstructure of the roof.

Transport
Public transport is co-ordinated by Transport for Greater Manchester.

Buses
Bus services in the area are provided by Stagecoach Manchester, First Group and a variety of smaller operators. The following routes serve Dukinfield: 

 220: Manchester city centre - Stalybridge, via Openshaw and Audenshaw. 
 221: Dukinfield - Manchester city centre, via Audenshaw and Openshaw. 
 330: Ashton-under-Lyne - Stockport, via Hyde, operating generally every ten minutes.
 335: Ashton-under-Lyne - Denton. 
 343: Hyde - Oldham, via Stalybridge, Carrbrook, Mossley and Lees. 
 345: Ashton-under-Lyne - Denton, via Audenshaw. 
 346: Ashton-under-Lyne - Gee Cross, via Newton and Hyde. 
 389: Ashton-under-Lyne - Yew Tree, via Stalybridge.

Railway
Dukinfield Central railway station, which was closed in 1959, provided local and national rail services. The nearest railway stations are now Stalybridge, Hyde North and Ashton-under-Lyne.

Tram
The second-generation tramway Manchester Metrolink terminates currently at nearby Ashton-under-Lyne for connections via Droylsden to the city centre and beyond. A tram network operated by the SHMD Joint Board ran lines through Dukinfield from 1904 to 1945, until their replacement by buses.

Air
Manchester Airport is located around 8 miles from the town and can be easily accessed by road and public transport.

Waterways
Dukinfield Junction is a canal junction which is the meeting point of the Peak Forest, Ashton and Huddersfield Narrow Canals.

Education

There are numerous primary schools and nurseries in the town for 5- to 11-year-olds.

There are secondary schools but no dedicated facility in Dukinfield for further education, the nearest establishment being Tameside College in Ashton-under-Lyne or Hyde.

All Saints Catholic College provides education for 16- to 18-year-olds. Since 1998, the sixth form facility has been provided for in a purpose-built extension to the main school.

Religion

The Moravian Church began their work in Dukinfield in 1751. They built a Moravian Settlement off of Old Road, where Moravian Close now is situated. God's Acre (the Moravian Burial Ground) still exists in Moravian Close, but was closed to further burials in 1973, when the work of the Moravians moved to Yew Tree Lane, where the Moravian Church is now situated. The parish church dedicated to St. John the Evangelist is a Commissioners' church built between 1840 and 1841 and consecrated the following year. A second parish was formed in 1846 and its church dedicated to St Mark was begun in 1847.

A number of Protestant and Catholic churches are based in the municipality, with the nearest mosque being in Ashton-under-Lyne, a short distance to the north of the town.

Sport

Dukinfield Cricket Club, founded in 1870, is a member of the Lancashire County League. For several seasons, Paul Turner was the club's "professional" player, leaving at the end of the 2005 season.  In 2015, the club signed Marty Kain (New Zealand) and Chris Marrow (South Africa). Martin Vidler is the club's youth coach.

Dukinfield Rugby Union Football Club currently plays in the South Lancashire & Cheshire 2 League of the Northern Division. The club plays its home games at Blocksages Playing Fields and is one of the oldest rugby teams from the historic county of Cheshire, having been founded in 1880. During the late 1990s and early 2000s, Mike Ford was head coach gaining 2 league promotions in 3 seasons. He left Dukinfield RUFC for a brief spell at Oldham RUFC but then left to take over as Defensive coordinator of Ireland (January 2002 – September 2005). In September 2004, he started working as Defence and Skills coach at Saracens in the Guinness Premiership before taking over as head coach. He had a spell as the defence coach of the England national rugby union team and is now head coach at Aviva Premiership side Bath.

Dukinfield Town AFC, founded in 1948, plays in the Bridgewater Office Supplies Manchester League and has a ground at Blocksage's Playing Fields, Birch Lane, next to Dukinfield Rugby Club. Dukinfield Town were winners of the Manchester Senior Cup in 1971, the final was played at Maine Road. Manchester Senior Cup archive.

It is the home of Dukinfield Central Bowling Club who play in the Tameside Mens Crown Green Bowling League and have won the premier division title in 2011, 2012, 2016, 2017, 2018 and 2019.

Public services
Dukinfield's town hall provides some limited civic facilities, including a police station and registry office, with the majority of local administration being based at Tameside Council headquarters, in Ashton-under-Lyne.

Dukinfield has a public library which is situated in Concord Way, as part of a small shopping precinct. Morrisons have a supermarket in the town. The old library was situated on Town Lane on land donated by the Astley family who donated money towards the building.
There is a park, around a quarter-mile from the town hall, providing gardens, a play area and leisure facilities.

A public swimming pool is now closed and has been turned into a fitness centre with an indoor running track. It is available as part of the borough facilities offered by Tameside Sport, as well as two full-size sports pitches, these are currently used by the town's rugby and football teams.
Rayner Stephens High School provides artificial multi-sports pitches, which can be reserved for use by the general public, outside school hours.

Notable people

Sportsmen
First-class cricketer Norman 'Buddy' Oldfield was born in Dukinfield. He played first class cricket for Lancashire and Northamptonshire from 1935 to 1954, and for England in 1939.
Tony Brooks, 1950s Formula One driver with six Grand Prix victories.
Tony Durose was born in Dukinfield and played first-class cricket for Northamptonshire from 1964 to 1969.
Scott "The Weapon" Fryer retired Silver medallist (Rio 16') in Archery. Now 1st class Sports Trader specialising in MMA. Born July 1990, born at St Matthews hospital, Dukinfield. Now resides in Glossop.

Actors and actresses
Kathy Staff (1928–2008)
Shirley Stelfox (1941–2015)
John Normington (1937–2007)

Musicians
John Lever, drummer with the Chameleons, the Sun & the Moon, later Red Sided Garter Snakes.
Ronnie Hazlehurst, celebrated composer and arranger of TV and radio theme music.
Kevin Parrott, record producer, musician. Producer of "Matchstalk Men and Matchstalk Cats and Dogs" by Brian and Michael, and the "Brian" of the said act.

Politicians
Carole James, Canadian politician and former Leader of the Opposition in the Legislative Assembly of British Columbia

Scientists
 Peter Daszak, zoologist
 Dennis Walsh, astronomer

Business
 Roderick Jones (1877–1962), head of Reuters, was born at Dukinfield.

 Wayne Griffiths - President of SEAT

Twin towns and sister cities
Champagnole is the twin town of Dukinfield since 1958. It is situated in Jura, France.

See also

Listed buildings in Dukinfield

References

Notes

Bibliography

 
Towns in Greater Manchester
Unparished areas in Greater Manchester
Geography of Tameside